Surendra Mohan Kumaramangalam (1 November 1916 — 30 May 1973) was an Indian politician and communist theorist who was a member of the Communist Party of India, and later, the Indian National Congress.He also served as Advocate-General for Madras State from 1966 to 1967.

Kumaramangalam was killed in the crash of Indian Airlines Flight 440 on May 31, 1973, at the age of 56.

Early life and education

Mohan Kumaramangalam was born in London to P. Subbarayan, then zamindar of Kumaramangalam in Thiruchengode Taluk, Namakkal district and later, Chief Minister of Madras Presidency and his wife, Radhabai Subbarayan on 1 November 1916. He was their third and youngest son, Paramasiva Prabhakar Kumaramangalam and Gopal Kumaramangalam being elder to him. Kumaramangalam was educated at Eton and King's College, Cambridge, serving as President of the Cambridge Union Society in 1938. During his period at Cambridge he was deeply influenced by Communism.

Kumaramangalam was called to the bar by the Inner Temple. He returned to India in  1939 and participated in the Indian Independence Movement.

Career

In the Indian Independence movement 

In  1941, Kumaramangalam was arrested along with P. Ramamurthi, C. S. Subramaniam and R. Umanath for distributing seditious pamphlets in what came to be known as the Madras Conspiracy Case. Kumaramangalam was later released. During the Second World War Kumaramangalam served as the editor of the communist magazine, People's War, which on the conclusion of hostilities he renamed as People's Age.

Post-independence politics 

In the days  following  India's independence Madras Presidency was gripped by a peasant rebellion, which compelled the provincial government to launch a crackdown on communists. Kumaramangalam was arrested along with other communist leaders  and released after the rebellion had subsided. Kumaramangalam favoured friendly relations with the Soviet Union and established the Indo-Soviet Cultural Society. However, with  the onset of the 1960s Kumaramangalam began distancing himself from communism. He served as Advocate General of Madras. Following the victory of the Dravida Munnetra Kazhagam in the 1967 Tamil Nadu Assembly elections, Kumaramangalam resigned from the Communist Party of India and joined the Indian National Congress.

Kumaramangalam was loyal to Indira Gandhi when the party split and was elected to the Lok Sabha from Pondicherry in the 1971 elections. He was the driving force behind Indira Gandhi's decision in 1973, to appoint Ajit Nath Ray was the Chief Justice of India superseding three senior judges of the Supreme Court of India - J. M. Shelat, A.N Grover and K. S. Hegde.

He served as the Minister of Steel and Mines from 1971 until his death in 1973.

Personal life 

Mohan Kumaramangalam married Kalyani Mukerjee, niece of Bengali politician Ajoy Mukherjee in 1943. Ajoy Mukherjee, later, served as the Chief Minister of West Bengal. The couple had a son, Rangarajan Kumaramangalam and two daughters. Rangarajan Kumaramangalam was a member of the Indian National Congress and later, the Bharatiya Janata Party and served as a minister in the Narasimha Rao and Atal Behari Vajpayee  governments. Mohan's daughter, Lalitha Kumaramangalam contested the 2004 and 2009 Lok Sabha elections as a Bharatiya Janata Party candidate from Tiruchirapalli and lost on both occasions. The older daughter is Uma Kumaramangalam who was Physics teacher Bal Krishan Kalra's student at Springdale Higher Secondary School in Delhi and is married to Malay Mukherjee.

Mohan Kumaramangalam's brother P. P. Kumaramangalam was a distinguished army officer who served as India's Chief of Army Staff. His sister, Parvathi Krishnan was a politician of the Communist Party of India and served three terms as Member of Parliament from Coimbatore.

Kumaramangalam's grandson, Muktesh Mukherjee, and his wife Xiaomao Bai, are among the two Canadian passengers aboard Malaysia Airlines Flight 370 which went missing since 8 March 2014.

Another grandson of Mohan Kumaramanglam is Rangarajan Mohan Kumaramangalam, who has joined politics after working as an entrepreneur and for technology companies. He unsuccessfully contested the Lok Sabha polls 2014 from Salem on a Congress ticket. He is the working president of Tamil Nadu Congress Committee.

Death 

Kumaramangalam was killed in the crash of Indian Airlines Flight 440 on May 31, 1973, at the age of 56. Many of the dead were unidentifiable, but his body was identified by a Parker pen and a hearing aid he wore.

Works

Mohan Kumaramangalam was a prominent communist theorist and authored a number of books and pamphlets. Some of his works include:

 
 
 
 
 
 
 
 
 
 
 
  at Google Books

Notes 

1916 births
1973 deaths
India MPs 1971–1977
Indian National Congress politicians from Tamil Nadu
Communist Party of India politicians from Tamil Nadu
People educated at Eton College
Alumni of King's College, Cambridge
Tamil lawyers
Lok Sabha members from Puducherry
Mohan
Advocates General for Tamil Nadu
Communist Party of India politicians from Puducherry
Indian National Congress politicians from Puducherry
Presidents of the Cambridge Union
Victims of aviation accidents or incidents in India
Victims of aviation accidents or incidents in 1973
English barristers